The Brady Bunch Movie is a 1995 American comedy film that parodies the 1969–1974 television series The Brady Bunch. The film was directed by Betty Thomas, with a screenplay by Laurice Elehwany, Rick Copp, and Bonnie and Terry Turner, and stars Shelley Long, Gary Cole, and Michael McKean. It also features cameos from Davy Jones, Micky Dolenz, Peter Tork, and RuPaul, along with some of the original cast of The Brady Bunch in small roles. The film places the original sitcom characters, with their 1970s fashion sense and sitcom family morality, in a contemporary 1990s setting, drawing humor from the resulting culture clash.

The Brady Bunch Movie was released in the United States on February 17, 1995, and grossed $54 million. A sequel titled A Very Brady Sequel was released on August 23, 1996, and a television film titled The Brady Bunch in the White House was aired on November 29, 2002.

Plot

Larry Dittmeyer, an unscrupulous real estate developer, explains to his supervisor that almost all the families in his neighborhood — except for the Brady family — have agreed to sell their property as part of a plan to turn the area into a shopping mall.

At the Bradys' house, Mike and Carol are having breakfast prepared by their housekeeper, Alice, while the six children prepare for school. Jan is jealous of her elder, popular sister Marcia. Cindy is tattling about everything she's hearing. Greg is dreaming of becoming a singer (but sings folk songs more appropriate to the seventies). Peter is beginning puberty with his voice starting to break and the numerous titillations he is exposed to, notably sex education and his very attractive teacher Miss Linley. He is also trying to win the affection of the girl he loves, Holly, but his shy and awkward personality prevents him from doing so, or so he thinks. Bobby is excited about his new role as hall monitor at school.

Cindy gives Mike and Carol a tax delinquency notice (which was earlier mistakenly delivered to the Dittmeyers) stating that they face foreclosure on their house if they do not pay $20,000 in back taxes. The two initially ignore the crisis, but when Mike's architectural design (which is exactly the same as their house) is turned down by two potential clients, he tells Carol that they may have to sell the house.

Cindy overhears this and tells her siblings and they look for work to raise money to save the house, but their earnings are nowhere near enough to reach the required sum. Mike manages to sell a Japanese company on one of his dated designs, thereby securing the money, only for Larry to sabotage it by claiming that Mike's last building collapsed.

On the night before the Bradys have to move out, Marcia suggests that they enter a "Search for the Stars" contest, the prize of which is exactly $20,000. Jan, having originally suggested this and been rejected, runs away from home. Cindy sees her leave and tattles, and the whole family goes on a search for her. They use their car's citizens' band radio, and their transmission is heard by Schultzy (Ann B. Davis), a long-haul trucker who picks up Jan and convinces her to return home.

The next day, the children join the "Search for the Stars" contest. Peter finally builds the confidence to stand up to Eric Dittmeyer, Peter's tormentor and Holly's boyfriend. This earns him a kiss from Holly, which gives him a deep masculine voice. The children's dated performance receives a poor audience response compared to the more modern performances of other bands. However, the judges — Davy Jones, Micky Dolenz, and Peter Tork of The Monkees — vote for them, and they win the contest as a result. The tax bill is paid, and their neighbors withdraw their homes from the market, foiling Larry's plan and securing the neighborhood.

Later, Carol's mother arrives and finally convinces Jan to stop being jealous of Marcia, only for Cindy to start feeling jealous of Jan.

Cast

Cameos
 Florence Henderson (the original Carol) as the family's grandmother, Carol's mother
 Ann B. Davis (the original Alice) as Schultzy, a trucker
 Barry Williams (the original Greg) as a record producer
 Christopher Knight (the original Peter) as a coach
 Davy Jones as himself
 Micky Dolenz as himself
 Peter Tork as himself

Production
The film was shot almost entirely in Los Angeles, California, with the Brady house being located in Sherman Oaks. The school scenes were shot at Taft High School in Woodland Hills. Some scenes were filmed at Bowcraft amusement park in Scotch Plains, New Jersey.

The producers had sought to film the original house that had been used for exterior shots during the original Brady Bunch series, but its appearance had been seriously altered since 1969. The filmmakers instead erected a façade around a house in nearby Encino and filmed scenes in the front yard.

Release
The Brady Bunch Movie was released in theaters on February 17, 1995. The film opened at number 1 at the US box office with $14.8 million in its opening four-day weekend and went on to gross $46.6 million in the U.S. and Canada. Internationally, it only grossed $7.5 million for a worldwide total of $54.1 million. The Brady Bunch Movie was released on DVD June 10, 2003 and April 25, 2017. The film has also been released digitally on Google Play.

Reception
The review aggregation website Rotten Tomatoes reported a 63% approval rating based on 43 reviews and an average rating of 5.9/10. The website's critical consensus reads: "Though lightweight and silly, The Brady Bunch Movie still charms as homage to the 70s sitcom".

Leonard Klady of Variety wrote: "For five years back in the early 1970s, U.S. TV homes were in the thrall of The Brady Bunch. Two decades after their small-screen demise, the clean-cut crew is back in mythic form as The Brady Bunch Movie. Part homage, part spoof, the deft balancing act is a clever adaptation—albeit culled from less than pedigreed source material". 

Roger Ebert of the Chicago Sun-Times wrote: "The film establishes a bland, reassuring, comforting Brady reality – a certain muted tone that works just fine but needs, I think, a bleaker contrast from outside to fully exploit the humor. The Brady Bunch Movie is rated PG-13, which is a compromise: The Bradys themselves live in a PG universe, and the movie would have been funnier if when they ventured outside it was obviously Wayne's World". He and Gene Siskel also agreed that the film offers charmingly bright and silly set decoration but fails to deliver genuine laughs.

Common Sense Media said that "for those who grew up watching the TV show, The Brady Bunch Movie is deeply satisfying and the best part is its nostalgia. Sure, it's fun to see the Bradys treated as freaks. But the heart of the film is a campy, affectionate interpretation of the TV show".

Sequels

A Very Brady Sequel

A Very Brady Sequel, directed by Arlene Sanford, was released theatrically on August 23, 1996. It sees the family routine thrown into disarray when a man claiming to be Carol's long-lost first husband arrives on their doorstep. The family must then follow Carol to Hawaii in order to set things straight. All of the main cast members reprised their roles.

The Brady Bunch in the White House

The second sequel, The Brady Bunch in the White House, sees a convoluted series of mishaps end with Mike and Carol Brady elected as President and Vice President of the United States. Despite innocent efforts to improve the country, the Brady family is beset on all sides by controversy and imagined scandals which threaten to tear them apart. Although the original actors for Mike and Carol return, the children and Alice are all recast for this film, which was released as a filmed-for-television movie.

References

External links
 
 
 
 
 

1995 films
1995 comedy films
American comedy films
American parody films
American satirical films
American screwball comedy films
American slapstick comedy films
1990s English-language films
Films based on television series
Films directed by Betty Thomas
Paramount Pictures films
Films with screenplays by Bonnie and Terry Turner
Films scored by Guy Moon
The Brady Bunch films
Films set in the 1990s
The Ladd Company films
1990s American films